Germany–Guyana relations are bilateral relations between Germany and Guyana. Relations have existed since 1966 and are described by the German Federal Foreign Office as "friendly and free of problems".

Diplomatic relations 
Since the year of Guyana's independence, 1966, diplomatic relations have existed with the Federal Republic of Germany and later Reunited Germany. On September 16, 2016, the 50th anniversary of mutual relations was celebrated.

Germany does not maintain an embassy in Guyana; the German Embassy in Port of Spain, Trinidad and Tobago is responsible. There is a German Honorary Consul in Georgetown. Guyana does not maintain an embassy in Germany. The embassy in Brussels in Belgium is responsible for relations with Germany.

Economy and development 
In 1994, a bilateral agreement was concluded to protect and promote investment. Relations continue between Germany and the Caribbean Community (CARICOM), of which Guyana is a member. In particular, projects are being pursued to promote the economy and protect the environment. In 2005, the G8 countries agreed to debt relief for numerous countries, which included Guyana.

In development policy, funding for ecological and environmental projects have priority. Thus Germany finances u. a. Projects for rainforest protection, like the "Guyana Protected Areas System", since 1998.

See also 
 Foreign relations of Germany
 Foreign relations of Guyana

External links 

 German Foreign Office information on relations with Guyana (in German)

Individual references